Catherine Harrison may refer to:

Catherine Harrison (tennis) (born 1994), American tennis player
Cathryn Harrison (1959–2018), English actress
Katherine Harrison, victim of notable 1670 witch trial in Wethersfield, Connecticut
Kathryn Harrison (born 1961), American author

See also
Harrison (name)